Casualties of War is a BBC Books original novel written by Steve Emmerson and based on the long-running British science fiction television series Doctor Who. It features the Eighth Doctor.

External links

2000 British novels
2000 science fiction novels
Eighth Doctor Adventures
Fiction about amnesia